This list of media awards honoring women is an index to articles about notable awards honoring women. 
The list includes general, literary and music awards for women.
It excludes awards for actresses, including film awards for lead actress  and television awards for Best Actress, which are covered by separate lists.

General

Literary

Music

See also

 Lists of awards
 List of awards honoring women
 List of media awards
 List of awards for actresses
 List of film awards for lead actress 
 List of television awards for Best Actress

References

 
Women-related lists